Kwiecień is a 1960 Polish war drama film directed by Witold Lesiewicz.

Synopsis
The film takes place in the first months of 1945. A unit of the Polish army prepares to cross the Lusatian Neisse river. The commander of the unit hits a subordinate during an argument. The latter files a report about the incident to the division prosecutor.

Cast and characters
 Henryk Bąk as Colonel Czapran
 Maria Ciesielska as Corporal Ruszkowska
 Leszek Herdegen as Ensign Szumibor
 Jan Kobuszewski as Pawel
 Tadeusz Kondrat as Klukwa
 August Kowalczyk as Division prosecutor
 Krzysztof Kowalewski as Sulikowski
 Jerzy Nowak as Mail carrier
 Piotr Pawłowski as Prosecutor Hyrny
 Franciszek Pieczka as Private Anklewicz
 Bolesław Płotnicki as Kozlowski
 Witold Pyrkosz as Lieutenant Galicki
 Jerzy Turek as Jasiek
 Stanislaw Tym as soldier

References

External links
 

1960 films
1960 drama films
Polish drama films
Polish black-and-white films
1960s Polish-language films
Films directed by Witold Lesiewicz